Karol Miarka may refer to:

People 
 Karol Miarka (father) (1825–1882), Polish social and national activist
 Karol Miarka (son) (1856–1919), Polish social and national activist

Places 
 Karol Miarka Liceum (Żory, Poland)